Walkin' Cane Mark (August 26, 1967 – June 21, 2020) was an American blues vocalist, harmonica player and recording artist, based in Phoenix, Arizona, United States.

Career timeline

(1986) Walkin' Cane Mark started singing with Phoenix blues bands at 19 years old.

(1989) Mark started his professional career at the age of 22 fronting blues and r&b band "Cold Shott & The Hurricane Horns", band leader/bass player Ted Kowal wanted a front man that had the live stage presence and wildness of the blue-eyed soul man Wayne Cochran. Ironically this was later also noticed by C.C. Rider alumni and WC Mark was invited as a special guest at two of Wayne Cochran & The CC Riders reunions (2001 & 2003; Hollywood and Miami Florida).

(1994) The start of W C Mark's solo career and the formation of "Walkin' Cane Mark & A Shot In The Dark".

(1995) Mark was signed to the independent record label JAEN Records (usually recording with his touring band at the time).

(1996) the 1996 "No Rest For The Wicked" album and tour featuring ex members of the Parliament Funkadelic (P-Funk) horn section.

(1997-2001) Mark teams up with blues/r&b shouter Nappy Brown for several tours of Europe with "The Nappy Brown/ Walkin' Cane Mark Blues Show".

(2001-2010) Mark performed as a side man (harmonica) and semi-retirement.

(2011) Walkin' Cane Mark was back recording his first album in 11 years, Tryin' To Make You Understand (title song co-written with Junior Wells in 1995).

(2012 – 2013) The launch of Walkincanemark.com. Cane begins work with new manager Christopher Slattery and roots/blues advocate Betsie Brown on Blind Raccoon.

(2013) "Tryin' To Make You Understand – Remastered" released recording nationally and internationally spending more than four weeks in the number one in the "Classic Blues Chart".

Origin
Willie Dixon dubbed Mark, "Walkin' Cane Mark" in 1988 when he was forced to walk with a cane after an injury. It was also Mr. Dixon who first recognized Mark's passion for blues and soul music. Dixon gave Cane "Gravedigger Blues" for his first CD.  Walkin' Cane Mark was taught his first harmonica licks by renowned band leader R.D. Olson, then went on to refine his technique under the tutelage of Chicago musicians Snooky Pryor & Junior Wells. Mark played in a "Mississippi Saxophone" style much like Snooky Pryor, (starting songs with a honking harmonica intro thus directing the backing band in the formation and feel of the song). Mark was also well known for mixing a classic "Memphis Soul" sound with his vocal delivery and larger than life stage presence. He is also known to be one of the youngest players that used older post WWII style of blues (such as Sunny Boy #1 & Snooky Pryor) harmonica playing. Walkin' Cane Mark is considered one of the most charismatic live personalities who performed the blues. (Source: "Walkin' Cane Mark's Blues" by Jarrett Hendricks)

Endorsements
Shaker Harmonica Microphones, RedPlate Amplifiers, Yonberg Harmonicas, Ziggies Music Phoenix

Discography

Albums

Guest and compilation albums

Albums

References

Sources
Blues America (Radio)
Sound Bites "Gravedigger" review by Lee Poole 1994
Payson Roundup "Walkin' Cane's Gonna Boogie" (July 15, 1994) by Joe Harless
Music Voice Magazine 1995 "Best Blues Vocalist Award (Walkin Cane Mark)"
IL Blues Magazine Reviews 1995 "Walkin Cane Mark The Gravedigger"
Music Voice Magazine 1995 "Talent Showcase – Walkin Cane Mark" by Robin Cote
Blast Magazine (April–May) 1995 "Walkin Cane Mark's Blues" by Jarrett Hendricks p. 39 
Mesa Tribune Newspaper 1995 "Blues Blast Featuring Walkin Cane Mark" article by Betty Web
Payson Roundup "June Bug Festival" (1995) 
Image Entertainment  May 18, 1995
Phoenix Gazette (section C1) "Profiles – Concerts" 1996 by Douglas McDaniel
Living Blues #129 (Sept/Oct) 1996 "No Rest For The Wicked" album review by PRA
Teton Valley Independent "Brewin The Blues W/ Walkin Cane Mark" July 24, 1997 p. 1B
Boise Weekly "P Funk & The Cane" July 1997
Cody Enterprise newspaper "Live In Person" August 1997
Phoenix Gazette "Walkin' Cane Intones R&B with Gospel" 1997 by Douglas McDaniel
Grand Blues Music press release May 2016

External links

1967 births
2020 deaths
American blues singers
Musicians from Phoenix, Arizona
Singers from Arizona
20th-century American singers
21st-century American singers